Möbius sign is a clinical sign in which there is an inability to maintain convergence of the eyes. It is found in patients with Graves' disease.

The sign is named after Paul Julius Möbius.

References 

Symptoms and signs: Endocrinology, nutrition, and metabolism
Endocrinology